Volcanic Tongue is a record shop, distribution company and record label located in Glasgow, Scotland. It specialises in underground music from the UK, US, Europe, Australia, New Zealand and Japan. They describe their remit as "free folk, psych, Japanese underground, noise, avant-garde, free jazz, blues, experimental, garage punk/DIY, minimal synth, drone, Industrial, sound poetry, prog, american primitive, private press, acid folk, classic 1960s/1970s rock, basement scum & assorted outsider modes". It was founded by David Keenan and Heather Leigh Murray in late 2004. Initially existing as a mail-order list and website, they opened their shop in February 2006.

Interviewed by Stylus in late 2005, Keenan described the rationale behind Volcanic Tongue's foundation as follows:

They are unusual amongst retail/distribution outlets for being dictated by the personal taste of the founders rather than by market forces. Keenan explained that "it’s not just a record shop; we have a really tough filter and will not stock anything that we don’t like ... I don’t want to sell a copy of a record that I don’t want in my collection."

Recently, they have expanded their label beyond small-run art editions of their own music (Scorces/Taurpis Tula/Heather Leigh Murray) to issue albums by Thurston Moore's Dream/Aktion Unit and Zaimph.

References

External links
 

British record labels